Al-Wazir is an Arabic language surname. Notable people with the surname include:
 Intissar al-Wazir (1941), member of the Palestinian Legislative Council and a former PNA minister
 Kamel al-Wazir, Transport Minister of Egypt
 Khalil al-Wazir (1935–1988), Palestinian leader and co-founder of the nationalist party Fatah
 Tarek Al-Wazir (1971), politician in the German Green Party

References 

Arabic-language surnames